Paul Dietz was a Swiss footballer who played for FC Basel. He played mainly as a forward, but also as a midfielder.

Football career
Between the years 1919 and 1924 Dietz played a total of 53 games for Basel scoring a total of 16 goals. 28 of these games were in the Swiss Serie A and 25 were friendly games. He scored six goal in the domestic league, the other 10 were scored during the test games.

References

Sources
 Rotblau: Jahrbuch Saison 2017/2018. Publisher: FC Basel Marketing AG. 
 Die ersten 125 Jahre. Publisher: Josef Zindel im Friedrich Reinhardt Verlag, Basel. 
 Verein "Basler Fussballarchiv" Homepage

FC Basel players
Swiss men's footballers
Association football forwards